Abhay Singh is an Indian politician and a member of 18th Legislative Assembly of Uttar Pradesh representing Goshainganj. He is a member of the Samajwadi Party and had represented Goshainganj in the 16th Legislative Assembly of Uttar Pradesh.

Personal life
Singh was born to Bhagwan Bux Singh and hails from Ayodhya city of Uttar Pradesh. He completed his graduation from Lucknow University in 1994. Singh is an agriculturalist by profession.

Political career
Active in the politics of Goshainganj, Singh as a Samajwadi Party candidate defeated Bahujan Samaj Party's Indra Pratap Tiwari in the 2012 Uttar Pradesh Legislative Assembly election, but lost to the latter in 2017, who had joined Bharatiya Janata Party prior to the election.

In the 2022 Uttar Pradesh Legislative Assembly election, Singh again representing Samajwadi Party from Goshainganj, defeated Bharatiya Janata Party's Aarti Tiwari, wife of incarcerated incumbent MLA Indra Pratap Tiwari, by a margin of 13,079 votes.

References

1970s births
Living people
Samajwadi Party politicians from Uttar Pradesh
Uttar Pradesh MLAs 2022–2027
People from Ayodhya
Year of birth missing (living people)